Antonella Ríos Mascetti (born July 31, 1974) is a Chilean television and film actress. Her best-known roles were Mariana in the telenovela "Brujas" and Gracia in the film "Los Debutantes".

Filmography

Films

Telenovelas
 Machos (Canal 13, 2003) - Yoly Mondaca
 Hippie (Canal 13, 2004) - Juana Pizarro
 Brujas (Canal 13, 2005) - Mariana Carvajal
 Descarado (Canal 13, 2006) - Catalina Montoya Bernard
 Lola (Canal 13, 2008) - Francisca Monsalve
 Cuenta Conmigo (Canal 13, 2009) - Margarita Jimenez
 Maldita (Mega, 2012) - Claudia Montero

References

External links
 

1974 births
Chilean telenovela actresses
Chilean film actresses
Chilean people of Italian descent
Living people
People from Valdivia